is a Japanese figure skating coach and former competitive pair skater. With her skating partner, Hiroshi Nagakubo, she became a five-time (1967–1971) Japanese national champion and competed at the 1972 Winter Olympics, placing 16th.

After retiring from competition, Nagasawa became a skating coach in Japan.

Competitive highlights
(with Nagakubo)

References

1950 births
Living people
Japanese female pair skaters
Olympic figure skaters of Japan
Figure skaters at the 1972 Winter Olympics